Marcus Falk-Olander (born 21 May 1987) is a former Swedish footballer.

External links

1987 births
Living people
Swedish footballers
Sweden under-21 international footballers
Sweden youth international footballers
Association football defenders
Allsvenskan players
Ettan Fotboll players
IF Elfsborg players
IFK Norrköping players
Trelleborgs FF players
Norrby IF players